Encyclia is an orchid genus with about 170 species. It belongs to the subfamily Epidendroideae of the orchid family (Orchidaceae).

The type species is Encyclia viridiflora Hook., Bot. Mag. 55: t. 2831 (1828).

 Encyclia acutifolia Schltr. (1923)
 Encyclia adenocarpa (Lex.) Schltr. (1914)
 Encyclia adenocaula (Lex.) Schltr. (1918) : Rough-stemmed Encyclia
 Encyclia advena (Rchb.f.) Porto & Brade (1935) : Advent Encyclia
 Encyclia aenicta Dressler & G.E.Pollard (1971) : Bronze Encyclia
 Encyclia alata (Bateman) Schltr., (1914)
 Encyclia alata subsp. alata : Winged Encyclia
 Encyclia alata subsp. parviflora (Regel) Dressler & G.E.Pollard (1971)
 Encyclia alata subsp. virella Dressler & G.E.Pollard (1971)
 Encyclia albopurpurea (Barb.Rodr.) Porto & Brade (1935)
 Encyclia alboxanthina Fowlie (1990)
 Encyclia altissima Schltr. (1914) : Very Tall Encyclia
 Encyclia amazonica Brongn. ex Neumann (1846)
 Encyclia ambigua (Lindl.) Schltr. (1914) : Ambiguous Encyclia
 Encyclia andrichii N.L.Menezes (1992)
 Encyclia angustifolia (Sw.) Schltr. (1918)
 Encyclia angustiloba Schltr. (1921)
 Encyclia argentinensis (Speg.) Hoehne (1952) : Argentine Encyclia
 Encyclia aspera (Lindl.) Schltr. (1918) : Rough-stalked Encyclia
 Encyclia asperula Dressler & G.E.Pollard  (1973 publ. 1974) : Asperulous Encyclia
 Encyclia auyantepuiensis Carnevali & I.Ramírez (1994)
 Encyclia bipapularis (Rchb.f.) Acuña (1939)
 Encyclia bohnkiana V.P.Castro & Campacci (1999) : Bohnk's Encyclia
 Encyclia bracteata Schltr. ex Hoehne (1930) : Bracted Encyclia
 Encyclia bractescens (Lindl.) Hoehne (1952) : Bractescent Encyclia
 Encyclia bradfordii (Griseb.) Carnevali & I.Ramírez (1986)
 Encyclia bragancae Ruschi (1976)
 Encyclia caicensis Sauleda & R.M.Adams (1978)
 Encyclia calderoniae Soto Arenas (2002 publ. 2003)
 Encyclia candollei (Lindl.) Schltr. (1914) : Candole's Encyclia
 Encyclia caximboensis L.C.Menezes (1992) : Caiximbo Encyclia
 Encyclia cajalbanensis Múj.Benítez (2005)
 Encyclia ceratistes (Lindl.) Schltr. (1919) : Horned-columned Encyclia
 Encyclia chapadensis N.L.Menezes (1993) : Chapada dos Viadeiros Encyclia
 Encyclia chiapasensis Withner & D.G.Hunt (1994) : Chiapas Encyclia
 Encyclia chironii V.P.Castro & J.B.F.Silva (2004)
 Encyclia chloroleuca (Hook.) Neumann (1846) : Green-and-white Encyclia
 Encyclia conchichila (Barb.Rodr.) Porto & Brade (1935)
 Encyclia contrerasii R.Gonzalez (1997)
 Encyclia cordigera (Kunth) Dressler (1964) : Large-lipped Encyclia
 Encyclia cyanocolumna (Ames, F.T.Hubb. & C.Schweinf.) Dressler (1961)
 Encyclia cyperifolia (C.Schweinf.) Carnevali & I.Ramírez (1993) : Sword-leafed Encyclia
 Encyclia dasilvae V.P.Castro & Campacci (2000)
 Encyclia davidhuntii Withner & M.Fuente (2001) : David Hunt's Encyclia
 Encyclia dichroma (Lindl.) Schltr. (1914) : Two-colored Encyclia
 Encyclia diota (Lindl.) Schltr. (1918) : Two-eared Encyclia
 Encyclia diota subsp. atrorubens (Rolfe) Dressler & G.E.Pollard (1971)
 Encyclia diota subsp. diota
 Encyclia distantiflora (A.Rich. & Galeotti) Dressler & G.E.Pollard (1971)
 Encyclia diurna (Jacq.) Schltr. (1919) : Daytime Encyclia
 Encyclia duveenii Pabst (1976)
 Encyclia edithiana L.C.Menezes (1996) : Edith's Encyclia
 Encyclia elegantula Dressler (2004) : Elegant Encyclia
 Encyclia euosma (Rchb.f.) Porto & Brade (1935)
 Encyclia expansa (Rchb.f.) P.Ortiz (1991) : Expanded Encyclia
 Encyclia fehlingii (Sauleda) Sauleda & R.M.Adams (1981)
 Encyclia flabellata (Lindl.) B.F.Thurst. & W.R.Thurst. (1977)
 Encyclia flava (Lindl.) Porto & Brade (1935) : Yellow Encyclia
 Encyclia fowliei Duveen (1990) : Fowlie's Encyclia
 Encyclia fucata (Lindl.) Schltr. (1914) : Brown-veined Encyclia
 Encyclia gallopavina (Rchb.f.) Porto & Brade (1935) : Peacock-like Encyclia
 Encyclia garzonensis Withner (2000)
 Encyclia ghillanyi Pabst (1976)
 Encyclia gonzalezii L.C.Menezes (1991) : Gonzalez' Encyclia
 Encyclia gracilis (Lindl.) Schltr. (1914) : Graceful Encyclia
 Encyclia granitica (Lindl.) Schltr. (1919) : Granite-growing Encyclia
 Encyclia gravida (Lindl.) Schltr. (1918)
 Encyclia guadalupeae R.Gonzalez & Alvarado (1999) : Guadalupe Encyclia
 Encyclia guatemalensis (Klotzsch) Dressler & G.E.Pollard (1971) : Guatemalan Encyclia
 Encyclia guianensis Carnevali & G.A.Romero (1994)
 Encyclia hanburyi (Lindl.) Schltr. (1914) : Hanbury's Encyclia
 Encyclia hermentiana Brongn. ex Neumann (1846)
 Encyclia howardii (Ames & Correll) Hoehne (1952) : Howard's Encyclia
 Encyclia huebneri Schltr. (1925)
 Encyclia huertae Soto Arenas & R.Jiménez (2002 publ. 2003) : Ground-dwelling Encyclia
 Encyclia inaguensis Nash ex Britton & Millsp. (1920) : Inagua Encyclia
 Encyclia incumbens (Lindl.) Mabb. (1984) : Aromatic Encyclia
 Encyclia ionosma (Lindl.) Schltr. (1914) : Violet-scented Encyclia
 Encyclia isochila (Rchb.f.) Dod (1986) : Equal-lipped Encyclia
 Encyclia ivoniae Carnevali & G.A.Romero (1994)
 Encyclia kennedyi (Fowlie & Withner) Hágsater (1973) : Kennedy's Encyclia
 Encyclia kermesina (Lindl.) P.Ortiz (1995)
 Encyclia kienastii (Rchb.f.) Dressler & G.E.Pollard (1971)
 Encyclia kingsii (C.D.Adams) Nir (1994) : King's Encyclia
 Encyclia kundergraberi V.P.Castro & Campacci (1998) : Kundergraeber's Encyclia
 Encyclia leucantha Schltr. (1919)
 Encyclia lineariloba Withner, (2001)
 Encyclia lorata Dressler & G.E.Pollard (1974) : Strap-leafed Encyclia
 Encyclia luteorosea (A.Rich. & Galeotti) Dressler & G.E.Pollard (1971) : Yellow-pink Encyclia
 Encyclia maderoi Schltr. (1920)
 Encyclia magdalenae Withner (2000) : Magdalena Encyclia
 Encyclia magnicallosa (C.Schweinf.) Pabst (1967 publ. 1972)
 Encyclia mapuerae (Huber) Brade & Pabst (1951)
 Encyclia maravalensis Withner (1995)
 Encyclia marxiana Campacci (2003)
 Encyclia meliosma (Rchb.f.) Schltr. (1918) : Honey-sweet Encyclia
 Encyclia microbulbon (Hook.) Schltr. (1918) : Small-bulbed Encyclia
 Encyclia microtos (Rchb.f.) Hoehne, (1952) : Tiny-eared Encyclia
 Encyclia monteverdensis M.A.Díaz & Ackerman (2004)
 Encyclia mooreana (Rolfe) Schltr. (1914) : Moore's Encyclia
 Encyclia naranjapatensis Dodson (1977) : Naranjapata Encyclia
 Encyclia nematocaulon (A.Rich.) Acuña (1939) : Thread-stemmed Encyclia
 Encyclia nizandensis Pérez-García & Hágsater (2002 publ. 2003)
 Encyclia obtusa (A.DC.) Schltr. (1918)
 Encyclia oestlundii (Ames, F.T.Hubb. & C.Schweinf.) Hágsater & Stermitz (1983) : Oestlund's Encyclia
 Encyclia oncidioides (Lindl.) Schltr. (1914) : Oncidium-like Encyclia
 Encyclia osmantha (Barb.Rodr.) Schltr. (1914) : Capart's Scented Encyclia
 Encyclia oxypetala (Lindl.) Schltr. (1918)
 Encyclia oxyphylla Schltr. (1925)
 Encyclia pachyantha (Lindl.) Hoehne (1952)
 Encyclia paraensis V.P.Castro & A.Cardoso (2003)
 Encyclia parallela (Lindl.) P.Ortiz (1995)
 Encyclia parviloba (Fawc. & Rendle) Nir (1994)
 Encyclia patens Hook. (1830) : Spreading-flowered Encyclia
 Encyclia pauciflora (Barb.Rodr.) Porto & Brade (1935) : Few-flowered Encyclia
 Encyclia peraltensis (Ames) Dressler (1997)
 Encyclia perplexa (Ames, F.T.Hubb. & C.Schweinf.) Dressler & G.E.Pollard (1971)
 Encyclia phoenicea (Lindl.) Neumann (1846) : Phoenician Encyclia
 Encyclia picta (Lindl.) Hoehne (1952)
 Encyclia pilosa (C.Schweinf.) Carnevali & I.Ramírez (1993)
 Encyclia plicata (Lindl.) Schltr. (1914) : Pleated Encyclia
 Encyclia pollardiana (Withner) Dressler & G.E.Pollard (1971) : Pollard's Encyclia
 Encyclia profusa (Rolfe) Dressler & G.E.Pollard (1971) : Profuse Encyclia
 Encyclia pyriformis (Lindl.) Schltr. (1914) : Pear-shaped Encyclia
 Encyclia randii (Barb.Rodr.) Porto & Brade (1935)
 Encyclia recurvata Schltr. (1919)
 Encyclia replicata (Lindl.) Schltr. (1920) : Folded-lip Encyclia
 Encyclia rufa (Lindl.) Britton & Millsp. (1920) : Bahama Encyclia
 Encyclia rzedowskiana Soto Arenas (2002 publ. 2003)
 Encyclia santos-dumontii L.C.Menezes (1992)
 Encyclia sclerocladia (Lindl. ex Rchb.f.) Hoehne (1952) :  Stiff-stalked Encyclia
 Encyclia seidelii Pabst (1976) :  Seidel's Encyclia
 Encyclia selligera (Bateman ex Lindl.) Schltr. (1914) : Saddle-lipped Encyclia
 Encyclia silvana Campacci (2003)
 Encyclia spatella (Rchb.f.) Schltr. (1924) : Spatulate-petaled Encyclia
 Encyclia spiritusanctensis L.C.Menezes (1990) : Espirito Santo Encyclia
 Encyclia steinbachii Schltr. (1922) : Steinbach's Encyclia
 Encyclia stellata (Lindl.) Schltr. (1914) : Starry Alanje Encyclia
 Encyclia suaveolens Dressler (1968 publ. 1971) : Sweet-smelling Encyclia
 Encyclia subulatifolia (A.Rich. & Galeotti) Dressler (1961) : Awl-shaped Encyclia
 Encyclia tampensis (Lindl.) Small (1913) : Florida Butterfly Orchid
 Encyclia tenuissima (Ames, F.T.Hubb. & C.Schweinf.) Dressler (1961)
 Encyclia thrombodes (Rchb.f.) Schltr. (1921)
 Encyclia tocantinensis V.P.Castro & Campacci (1996)
 Encyclia trachycarpa (Lindl.) Schltr (1918) : Rough-fruited Encyclia
 Encyclia trautmannii Senghas (2001)
 Encyclia triangulifera (Rchb.f.) Acuña (1939) : Triangular Encyclia
 Encyclia tripartita (Vell.) Hoehne (1952)
 Encyclia tuerckheimii Schltr. (1918) : Tuerckheim's Encyclia 
 Encyclia unaensis Fowlie (1991) : Una Encyclia
 Encyclia uxpanapensis Salazar (1999)
 Encyclia viridiflora Hook. (1828)
 Encyclia withneri (Sauleda) Sauleda & R.M.Adams (1981) : Withner's Encyclia
 Encyclia xerophytica Pabst (1976) : Desert Encyclia
 Encyclia xipheroides (Kraenzl.) Porto & Brade (1935)
 Encyclia yauaperyensis (Barb.Rodr.) Porto & Brade (1935) : Yauapery Encyclia

Natural hybrids 

 Encyclia × alcardoi V.P.Castro & Chiron (2002) (Encyclia argentinensis × Encyclia flava)
 Encyclia × bajamarensis Sauleda & R.M.Adams (1981) (Encyclia gracilis × Encyclia rufa)
 Encyclia × guzinskii Sauleda & R.M.Adams (1990) (Encyclia altissima × Encyclia plicata)
 Encyclia × hillyerorum Sauleda & R.M.Adams (1990) (Encyclia fehlingii × Encyclia fucata)
 Encyclia × knowlesii Sauleda & R.M.Adams (1990) (Encyclia fehlingii × Encyclia plicata)
 Encyclia × lleidae Sauleda & R.M.Adams, (1984) (Encyclia gracilis × Encyclia plicata)
 Encyclia × lucayana Sauleda & R.M.Adams (1981) (Encyclia fahlingii × Encyclia gracilis)
 Encyclia × raganii Sauleda & R.M.Adams (1984) (Encyclia altissima × Encyclia gracilis)

Lists of plant species